Federal Commitment is an Peronist political party in Argentina formed by the fusion of Es Posible Party and the Independent Movement of Justice and Dignity. The party is currently part of the governing  Everyone’s Front coalition of President Alberto Fernández and Vice President Cristina Kirchner since 2019.

History
The Federal Commitment proposal postulates replicating the "San Luis" model at the national level. The province of San Luis, received different distinctions by the United Nations in terms of caring for the environment, and by the former Vice President of the United States and Nobel Peace Prize, Al Gore, who visited the Province of San Luis in 2015. 

In the national order, the Province of San Luis was rated in 2015 as the best managed in the country by private consultants for the seventh consecutive year in terms of Fiscal Efficiency, Social Indicators, Infrastructure, Fiscal Solvency, and Foreign Trade. In addition, in its ambition to create a Silicon Valley, San Luis was positioned as fourth in the ranking of 150 digital metropolises prepared by Motorola. 

It was originally a political alliance in 2011 composed of the Green Party, Es Posible, UNIR, the Democratic Party, PAIS Party and Republican Proposal. 

San Luis Governor Alberto Rodríguez Saá (2007 and 2011) and Senator Adolfo Rodríguez Saá (2015) were the party’s candidates in the general elections.

The party is part of the governing Frente de Todos coalition that supported 2019 Argentine presidential candidate an now President Alberto Fernández during the 2019 Argentine general election. It was also part of the Citizen's Unity between 2017 and 2019.

Ideology 
Originally a Federal Peronist party, Federal Commitment later abandoned Federal Peronism and joined the Kirchnerist Citizen's Unity in 2017.

Electoral history

Presidential elections

References

2011 establishments in Argentina
Peronist parties and alliances in Argentina
Political parties established in 2011
Political parties in Argentina
San Luis Province